The Mission Province is a Swedish independent ecclesiastical province founded by members of the Church of Sweden who are opposed to the ordination of women to the priesthood and episcopate. The province, which aligns with Confessional Lutheranism, considers itself as a free-standing diocese within the Church of Sweden, a position rejected by the church itself. The Mission Province was founded on 6 September 2003 and shares altar and pulpit fellowship with those in the Communion of Nordic Lutheran Dioceses, in addition to being a member of the International Lutheran Conference.

History 
The Province was founded as an alternative ecclesiastical jurisdiction in order to support the establishment of new free Eucharistic communities (koinonias). It contains the Catholic, Schartauan, Confessional and Evangelical expressions found in the Church of Sweden on the doctrinal basis of the Book of Concord.

On 5 February 2005, The Most Reverend Walter Obare Omwanza, presiding bishop of the Evangelical Lutheran Church in Kenya, assisted by bishops Leonid Zviki from Belarus, David Tswaedi from South Africa, Børre Knudsen and Ulf Asp from Norway, consecrated Arne Olsson in apostolic succession as the Ordinary for the Mission Province.

In April 2006, Bishop Arne Olsson consecrated pastors Lars Artman and Göran Beijer as assistant bishops for the Mission Province. The alternative hierarchy of the Mission province ordains candidates for the priesthood who are not in favour of the ordination of women and who are therefore not accepted for ordination in the national Churches of Sweden or Finland. In Sweden there are 25-30 congregations led by Mission Province priests, in addition to 30-35 congregations in Finland. 

Though the Mission Province holds itself to be a non-territorial diocese within the Church of Sweden, bishops of the Church of Sweden do not acknowledge the Mission Province as a part of the Church of Sweden and Bishop Arne Olsson was defrocked soon after his episcopal ordination as were Lars Artman and Göran Beijer.

Since 2015 the Mission Province has been in fellowship with the Evangelical Lutheran Mission Diocese of Finland and the Evangelical Lutheran Diocese of Norway. The Mission Province is also, as of 2018, a member of the International Lutheran Council.

See also
 Evangelical Lutheran Mission Diocese of Finland
 Matti Väisänen (bishop)
 Nordic Catholic Church
 Continuing Anglican movement

References

External links
Homepage of Missionsprovinsen 
 Statutes for The Mission Province in Sweden, decided by The Provincial Convention, May 17th, 2004 (some additions the 15th of January 2005) 
 A Report on a Visit to the Free Synod of the Church of Sweden and the Missionary Province 18 – 29 August, 2003 by The Rev. Paul C. Hewett, SSC
 Report from Sweden by Bishop Goran Beijer. The National Assembly of Forward in Faith UK on Friday 6th and Saturday 7 October 2006

Church of Sweden
Christian organizations established in 2003
2003 establishments in Sweden